The 2023 Under Siege is an upcoming professional wrestling event produced by Impact Wrestling. It will take place on May 26, 2023, at the Western Fair District Agriplex in London, Ontario, Canada, and air on Impact Plus and YouTube. It will be the third event in the Under Siege chronology.

Production

Background 
Under Siege is a professional wrestling event held by Impact Wrestling. It is annually held during the month of May, and the first event was held in 2021. On March 8, 2023, Impact Wrestling announced that Under Siege would take place on May 26, 2023, at the Western Fair District Agriplex in London, Ontario, Canada.

Storylines 
The event will feature several professional wrestling matches that involve different wrestlers from pre-existing scripted feuds, plots, and storylines. Wrestlers portray heroes, villains, or less distinguishable characters in scripted events that build tension and culminate in a wrestling match or series of matches. Storylines were produced on Impact's weekly television program.

Notes

References

External links 
 

2023 Impact Plus Monthly Special events
2023 in Ontario
2023 in professional wrestling
Events in Ontario
May 2023 events in Canada
London, Ontario
Professional wrestling in Ontario